The 2017 Kazakhstan Cup was the 26th season of the Kazakhstan Cup, the annual nationwide football cup competition of Kazakhstan since the independence of the country.

Participating clubs 
The following 21 teams qualified for the competition:

Schedule
The rounds of the 2017 competition are scheduled as follows:
 Group Stages: 28 March - 6 April 2017
 Last 16: 
 Quarterfinal: 
 Semifinal: 
 Final:

Group stages
The following groups stages were announced on 22 February 2017.

Group A

Group B

On March 30, Altai Semey withdrew from Cup.

Group C

Last 16

Quarterfinal

Semifinals
The four winners from the quarterfinals were drawn into two two-legged ties.

Final

Scorers

3 goals:

 Gerard Gohou, Kairat

2 goals:

 Novica Maksimović, Atyrau
 Ivo Iličević, Kairat
 Askar Abutov, Kyran
 Aleksandr Sokolenko, Kyzylzhar
 Edige Oralbai, Makhtaaral
 Rahmatulla Zhakudaev, Sports School №7
 Oleg Hromțov, Zhetysu

1 goals:

 Abzal Beisebekov, Astana
 Ivan Rodić, Atyrau
 Vladimir Dvalishvili, Atyrau
 Dauren Kayralliyev, Atyrau
 Aibar Nurybekov, Atyrau
 Erkasym Eshenkul, Caspiy
 Rodrigo António, Irtysh Pavlodar
 Franck Dja Djédjé, Irtysh Pavlodar
 Béko Fofana, Irtysh Pavlodar
 Elzhas Altynbekov, Kaisar
 Duman Narzildaev, Kaisar
 Bauyrzhan Islamkhan, Kairat
 Andrey Arshavin, Kairat
 Georgy Zhukov, Kairat
 Aydar Zhaksybek, Kyran
 Timur Muldinov, Kyzylzhar
 Geysar Alekperzade, Makhtaaral
 Tokhtar Bakhtiari, Makhtaaral
 Ablayhan Makhambetov, Makhtaaral
 Elmar Nabiev, Makhtaaral
 Aleksandr Marochkin, Okzhetpes
 Maxim Fedin, Okzhetpes
 Sergey Shaff, Okzhetpes
 Igor Yurin, Okzhetpes
 Daniil Chertov, Okzhetpes
 Gogita Gogua, Ordabasy
 Bekzat Beisenov, Ordabasy
 Vitali Li, Ordabasy
 Amir Temirlan, Sports School №7
 Didier Kadio, Shakhter Karagandy
 Aidos Tattybaev, Shakhter Karagandy
 Daurenbek Tazhimbetov, Shakhter Karagandy
 Marko Stanojević, Shakhter Karagandy
 Július Szöke, Shakhter Karagandy
 Toktar Zhangylyshbay, Tobol
 Vyacheslav Serdyukov, Zhetysu
 Aleksey Shakin, Zhetysu
 Artem Kasyanov, Zhetysu

Own goal

 Vladimir Pokatilov, Zhetysu (vs Ruzaevka)

References

External links 
 

2017
Cup
2017 domestic association football cups